Arnomyia is a genus of small flies of the family Lauxaniidae.

Species
A. immaculipennis Malloch, 1933
A. taitensis (Frauenfeld, 1867)

References

Lauxaniidae
Schizophora genera
Diptera of Asia